"Party at the NSA" is a protest song and charity single originally recorded by electropop music group Yacht released on August 15, 2013. It was written, recorded, and produced by Jona Bechtolt and Claire L. Evans. Inspired by the 2013 global surveillance disclosures, proceeds from the single benefit the international non-profit digital rights group Electronic Frontier Foundation.

Stand-up comedian and podcast host Marc Maron contributed a guitar solo to the song.

Release 
"Party at the NSA" was released on August 15, 2013, as a direct download link on partyatthensa.com with a pay what you want option and the statement:

We live much of our lives online; we should be outraged by the extent of the NSA's domestic spying programs. Instead, we are sinking into a dangerous indifference. Insidious forces are at work. Help us reverse the entropy. The Electronic Frontier Foundation is a donation-supported nonprofit that fights back against the government to protect our digital rights; 100% of your donation to download "Party at the NSA" will go straight to fund their important work.

The website made for the song uses a special font designed by a former National Security Agency contractor that is supposedly unreadable by optical character recognition software.

Reception

"Party at the NSA" received positive reviews. Internet forum Big Thinks Nicholas Clairmont found it a "fun yet serious protest song" that "features an upbeat tone and bitter lyrics criticizing the widespread domestic surveillance being done by the NSA's PRISM program, among others." Music blog BrooklynVegan reviewed it as in "early B-52s-style new wave format". Media company CMJs Brooke Segarra reviewed the song as "a high-gear dance number that has caffeine in its bass drum and a vendetta against government spying. The quirky urgency, oscillating synth, and forewarnings about the U.S. surveillance state makes the track sound like a musical rendition of some estranged cyberpunk novel." IFCs Melissa Locker noted that Marc Maron plays a "mean guitar".

Brian Merchant of Vices Motherboard reviewed "Party at the NSA" as a "fantastically goofball paranoid dance jam" as well as "a catchy, new wavy dance tune with, you know, satirically topical lyrics." Rolling Stones Christian Hoard called it a "lefty satire you can dance to: a deadpan-catchy shot at the surveillance state, complete with references to PRISM, whistle-blowing and the NSA data-gathering center in Utah." Spins Chris Martins reviewed the song as "[a] punk-addled dance-ripper [that] takes aim at the U.S. government's controversial information gathering techniques." Stereogums Tom Breihan said it was "a lightweight new-wave jam about the surveillance state, which puts it firmly in the '99 Luftballoons' tradition of lightweight new-wave jams about heavy issues." The Strangers Dave Segal said it "sounds like Devo and the B-52s taking liberties with Elvis Costello's 'Pump It Up.' In other words, it's an infeasibly upbeat, new-wave dance jam for such a dark subject."

Personnel

Yacht
Jona Bechtolt
Claire L. Evans

Additional musicians
Rob Kieswetter – bass guitar
Marc Maron – guitar solo

Production
Timothy Stollenwerk – audio mastering
Tim Lahan – artwork

See also 
Protest songs in the United States

References

External links 

2013 singles
2013 songs
Charity singles
Works about the National Security Agency
Protest songs